The 2014–2015 Pentangular One Day Cup was a List A (limited overs) cricket tournament in Pakistan. It was the third edition of the Pentangular One Day Cup. Sponsored by Haier, it was titled as the Cool & Cool presents Haier Pentangular One-day Cup. The tournament was originally scheduled to be held in Multan but was moved to Karachi due to persistent foggy conditions in Punjab.

The tournament was contested by five teams, four representing provinces and one from the capital, in a round-robin group stage followed by a final between the two top teams. The winners were Khyber Pakhtunkhwa Fighters, who beat Baluchistan Warriors in the final.

Venue

Group stage

Points table

Fixtures and results

Final

Statistics

Most runs

Most wickets

Source:

References

External links
 Series home at ESPN Cricinfo

2014 in Pakistani cricket
2015 in Pakistani cricket
Domestic cricket competitions in 2014–15
Cricket in Karachi
2014-15
January 2015 sports events in Pakistan